Crudaria leroma, the silver-spotted grey, is a butterfly of the family Lycaenidae. It is found in south-western Africa, including Zimbabwe, Mozambique, Botswana and South Africa. In South Africa, it is found from the Western to the Eastern and Northern Cape, KwaZulu-Natal, the Free State, Mpumalanga, Limpopo, North West and Gauteng provinces.

The wingspan is 20–32 mm for males and 25–34 mm for females. Adults are on wing year-round in warmer areas and from October to March in cooler areas.

The larvae feed on Acacia karroo, A. sieberana, and Elephantorrhiza burkei.

References

Butterflies described in 1857
Aphnaeinae
Taxa named by Hans Daniel Johan Wallengren